Iolaus laon, the fine sapphire, is a butterfly in the family Lycaenidae. It is found in eastern Ivory Coast, Ghana, Togo and western Nigeria. The habitat consists of forests and disturbed areas such as cocoa plantations.

The larvae feed on the flowers of Loranthus incanus. They are mole coloured.

References

External links

Die Gross-Schmetterlinge der Erde 13: Die Afrikanischen Tagfalter. Plate XIII 67 g
Die Gross-Schmetterlinge der Erde 13: Die Afrikanischen Tagfalter. Plate XIII 68 d as (synonym) adamsi Lathy, 1903

Butterflies described in 1878
Iolaus (butterfly)
Butterflies of Africa
Taxa named by William Chapman Hewitson